The pound was the currency of the Federation of Rhodesia and Nyasaland. It was subdivided into 20 shillings, each of 12 pence.

History

The Federation was formed in 1953, and the new currency was created in 1955 to replace the Southern Rhodesian pound which had been circulating in all parts of the federation (Southern Rhodesia, Northern Rhodesia, and Nyasaland). The Rhodesia and Nyasaland pound replaced the Southern Rhodesian pound at par and was pegged at par to sterling.

The Federation broke up at the end of 1963 and the three territories reverted to being separate British colonies. In the second half of 1964, Nyasaland became independent as Malawi, Northern Rhodesia became independent as Zambia, and Southern Rhodesia declared a name change to Rhodesia. Each issued their own pounds, at par with the Rhodesia and Nyasaland pound. See Malawian pound, Zambian pound and Rhodesian pound.

Coins

The Federation also issued its own coinage. In 1955 a full new set of coins were issued with the Mary Gillick obverse of the Queen and various African animals on the reverse. The denominations followed those of sterling, namely halfpennies and pennies, which had a hole in them, threepences (known as tickeys), sixpences, shillings, a two shilling piece and a half crown. There were further full issues of all these coins in 1956 and 1957, but thereafter only pennies and half pennies were produced until some further issues of sixpences in 1962 and 1963, and threepences in 1963 and 1964. The higher denomination coins, though not particularly rare, are very popular with collectors because of their attractive reverse designs. Threepences and halfpennies were struck in 1964 despite the fact the Federation ended on 31 December 1963.

Banknotes

From 1956 to 1961, the Bank of Rhodesia and Nyasaland issued notes for 10/–, £1, £5 and £10.

References

External links

Rhodesian Currency

Currencies of Africa
Currencies of the Commonwealth of Nations
Currencies of Malawi
Currencies of Rhodesia
Currencies of Zambia
Currencies of Zimbabwe
Modern obsolete currencies
1956 establishments in the Federation of Rhodesia and Nyasaland
1964 disestablishments
Federation of Rhodesia and Nyasaland